Pilar Delilah Veloso Pilapil-Penas (born October 12, 1950), popularly known as Pilar Pilapil, is a Filipino actress and former beauty queen. She was crowned as Binibining Pilipinas Universe 1967. She represented the Philippines at the Miss Universe 1967 pageant but was unplaced.

In the 1970s, 1980s and 1990s her highly publicized life became the staple of the multimedia.

Pilapil starred in Highly Acclaimed Films such as Kailan Ba Tama Ang Mali in 1985, Tinik Sa Dibdib and Nagkapasakit Kuya Eddie an outstanding feat she was nominated and won one award in the movie categories for FAP FAMAS and MMFF then Manila Film Festival in 1985 in 1988.

She did the film Kailan Mahugasan Ang Kasalanan she continued to take a break and then came back with more movie projects such as Forever with Aga Muhlach and Mikee Counjangco and Tayo Na Sa Dilim and Bakit Ako Mahihiya in 1997.

She went on to do a soap called Mulha Ng Buhay for Viva Television as a main antagonist of the television series.

Early life 

Pilar Delilah Veloso Pilapil was born on October 12, 1950, in Liloan, Cebu, Philippines the youngest of six girls with four brothers after her.

Career 

After winning the Binibining Pilipinas beauty pageant in 1967, Pilapil was swamped with offers to join the movies. Her first film was the action picture El Nino in 1968 with Andy Poe as her leading man, directed by Fernando Poe, Jr. She did movies with Dolphy such as Dolpe De Gulat in 1969 and El Pinoy Matador in 1970, among others. Pilapil won two best actress awards, one for the movie Imelda, Ang Uliran in 1970 at the Manila Film Festival and another for the film Napakasakit Kuya Eddie in 1986 for Gawad Urian Award 1987.

In 1996 she did the afternoon drama Mukha Nang Buhay a television soap for Viva Television produced for RPN-9 and simultaneously aired on IBC-13 and its international channel RPN USA as the main antagonist to Lovely Rivero's character and the series. this would become her first Soap Opera on television after later doing work for GMA-7 and mostly  ABS-CBN Primetime Dramas.

She also dabbled in politics when she ran for senator in 2004 as an independent candidate but she lost.
Pilapil continues to entertain viewers via ABS-CBN's primetime drama series Ina, Kapatid, Anak premiered on October 8, 2012, and ended in June 2013, and is now airing by Jeepney TV. In 2015 she made her comeback with Pangako Sayo, which she plays Doña Benita Buenavista which originally by Liza Lorena.

In February 2020, she returned to GMA-7 after thirteen years of stay with ABS-CBN to appear in Sanya Lopez's teleserye, First Yaya.

Personal life

Family and relationships 

Pilapil has a daughter with former Vice President of the Philippines Salvador Laurel named Pia Pilapil, who is also an actress. She married Spanish journalist Michel Ponti on October 12, 1986, at the Manila Cathedral, but they divorced after a year. She became a born-again Christian in 1995, and married Pastor Bernie Penas on May 18, 2002.

Philanthropy 

In 2006, Pilapil released an autobiography The Woman Without A Face, chronicling her life in show business an in private after she went on a shirt retirement. The sales of the book went to the Pilar Pilapil Foundation, an organization founded by Pilapil which helps battered and abused women.

2011 Stabbing incident 

Pilapil was found in a grassy lot in Antipolo with at least five stab wounds in her body and was rushed to the Medical City Hospital in Pasig City on the night of April 14.

A companion, Rosel Peñas driving her Kia Carens, picked up Pilapil from a mall, supposedly to introduce her to the executives of Unilever Australia, who were then at Riverbend Hotel in Marikina. Peñas was driving when two unidentified men forced their way into the vehicle, stabbed Pilapil, then sped away with Peñas. 

Peñas, initially a co-victim, was later tagged as perpetrator and was charged with kidnapping and frustrated murder at the Antipolo prosecutor's office on November 2011.

Filmography

Television

Film

Awards and nominations

References

External links

Pilar Pilapil landscapes
Pilar Pilapil: A Colorful Life

1950 births
Living people
20th-century Cebuano actresses
21st-century Cebuano actresses
Cebuano film actresses
Cebuano television actresses
Actresses from Tarlac
Binibining Pilipinas winners
Miss Universe 1967 contestants
People from Cebu
Stabbing survivors
Cebuano beauty pageant winners
GMA Network personalities
ABS-CBN personalities